Ek Naya Rishta is a  1988 Indian drama film. The film was produced and directed by Vinod Pande, starring Rekha, Raj Kiran, Mazhar Khan and Om Shivpuri among others. The film is a modern take on relationships, business, independence, interdependence and the institution of marriage and hints at indirect surrogacy. It was perhaps the first movie of its time to talk about surrogacy. It also highlighted how society forces the helpless to fall prey to the murky business of prostitution and lesbianism.
Many scenes in the 2001 hit Chori Chori Chupke Chupke are a direct lift off from Ek Naya Rishta and the story of Chori Chori Chupke Chupke in essence is taken from this movie.

Plot 
Womanizer and alcoholic Rajiv Tandon lives a wealthy lifestyle with his widowed industrialist dad, Shankardayal in a palatial house. Rajiv is not interested in marriage, or in any permanent relationship with any woman. His dad dies, he wills that all his wealth and money will only be inherited by Rajiv after he gets a son within 18 months of his death. Thus follows a series of incidents, where he starts searching for a suitable woman who would give birth to his child sans any demand of marriage. He readily offers a huge sum and a luxurious lifestyle to a woman whose willing to give birth without becoming his permanent responsibility.

Production
Filming started around 1984-5, but the production later stalled as Pande ran into problems with produces not willing to finance it. In March 1986, The Illustrated Weekly of India reported that the film was now ready for release.

Cast 
Rekha as Aarti
Raj Kiran as Rajiv Dayal Tandon
Mazhar Khan as Sanjay Kumar
Om Shivpuri as Shankar Dayal Tandon
Vinod Pande as Rajan
Rabia Amin as Rosy
Surendra Pal as Vikram
Urmila Bhatt as Aarti's mother
Anjan Srivastav as Rajiv's relative
C.S. Dubey as Rajiv's relative
Yunus Parvez as Aarti's customer
Marc Zuber (guest appearance)

Music

Reception
Democratic World magazine wrote that the film is "written the from the woman's point of view". The 1991 film directory Collections edited by Ratan Sharda gave the film a rating of 3 stars.

References

External links 

1988 films
1980s Hindi-language films
Films scored by Khayyam